Combs College of Music was founded in Philadelphia, Pennsylvania, United States, in 1885 as Combs Broad Street Conservatory of Music by Gilbert Raynolds Combs, celebrated pianist, organist and composer.

The faculty included famous musicians such as Leopold Godowsky, Hugh Archibald Clark and Henry Schradieck. 
In 1908 the college was chartered to grant academic  degrees in music. The name of the college was changed in 1933 to Combs College of Music. Combs was the first music college to have dormitories and foreign students. In 1954, Helen Behr Braun, a graduate of Combs Broad Street Conservatory and  a concert violinist, succeeded to the Presidency. Under her direction an impressive faculty was assembled which included Jean Casadesus, Leo Ornstein,  Philadelphia Orchestra members Jacob Krachmalnick, Carl Torello and William Kincaid, musicologist Guy Marriner and composer Romeo Cascarino.

A partial list of notable faculty during the 1970s and 80s also included the duo-piano team of Toni and Rosi Grunschlag, performers and pedagogues Jacob Neupauer, Michael Guerra, Donald Reinhardt, Anthony Weigand, Romeo Cascarino, Dolores Ferraro, Frank Versaci, Joseph Primavera, Keith Chapman, Morton Berger, Howard Haines, William Fabrizio and John McIntyre. As early as 1954 Helen Braun was exploring the use of music as a therapy. The college engaged in many early research projects; one sponsored by the Rudolf Steiner Foundation, which sent distinguished composer and Combs alumnus Paul Nordoff to England and Scotland to study the use of music for special needs children. Together with Clive Robbins, he pioneered a unique program of music therapy, widely recognized for its innovative and effective results. With Nordoff's teachings as a foundation, Combs was the first college in the Philadelphia area to offer an educational program in Music Therapy. Many of the leading practitioners in that field received their degrees from Combs.(see notable alumni below)

The college moved from Center City to the city's West Mount Airy neighborhood and occupying many houses in the Pelham section in 1964, expanding the campus and adding dormitories. In 1984, the college relocated again to a new- campus in Radnor, Pennsylvania.   Just prior to this move, Combs' Head of Composition and Composer in Residence Romeo Cascarino's opera William Penn attracted international attention. Sponsored by the college and the William Penn Opera Committee in cooperation with the Century IV Celebration, it was successfully mounted and performed at Philadelphia's prestigious Academy of Music in 1982.
           
The college moved back to Philadelphia in 1987 to the campus of Spring Garden College. During the economic climate of those years, Combs College of Music, like so many small private institutions, experienced financial hardship and found its endowment inadequate. In 1990, the Board of Trustees made the decision to close its doors.

Accreditations and memberships
The National Association of Schools of Music
The Middle  States Association of Colleges and Schools
The National Association for Music Therapy
The American Association of Music Therapy
The Pennsylvania Department of Education (for teacher certification)

Notable alumni
Notable Combs alumni include: 
Stanley Branche, civil rights activist, founder of the Committee for Freedom Now
John Coltrane, saxophonist, composer 
Marc Copland, jazz pianist
Khan Jamal, jazz vibraphonist
Gail Levin, music therapist, author  
Robert Manno, composer, conductor, Windham Chamber Music Festival
Vincent Persichetti, composer, author, educator

Honorary degrees
Recipients of honorary Doctor of Music (D.Mus) degrees from Combs included:
Marian Anderson, contralto
Samuel Barber, composer, pianist, singer
Harold Boatrite, composer, educator           
Romeo Cascarino, composer, pianist, arranger, educator 
Keith Chapman, composer, organist at the Wanamaker Organ                                                       
Mischa Elman, concert violinist
Marc Mostovoy, conductor, founder, Chamber Orchestra of Philadelphia
Paul Nordoff, composer, music therapist, author 
Temple Painter, concert harpsichordist, organist, pianist, educator
Vincent Persichetti, composer, author, educator
Leopold Stokowski, conductor
Mary Louise Curtis Bok Zimbalist, founder, Curtis Institute of Music
Thomas LoMonaco, tenor, noted pedagogue
 Frank Versaci, concert flutist

Additionally, Combs awarded honorary Doctor of Humane Letters (D.H.L.) degrees to notables including:
Pearl S. Buck, author, philanthropist
Thacher Longstreth, civic leader, Philadelphia City Councilman

References

Educational institutions established in 1885
Music schools in Pennsylvania
Defunct universities and colleges in Philadelphia
Pennsylvania
Educational institutions disestablished in 1990
1885 establishments in Pennsylvania